Lister og Mandals Amtstidende was a Norwegian newspaper, published in Mandal.

Lister og Mandals Amtstidende was started in 1909 as Lister og Mandals Amtstidende og Adresseavis. Its name was changed in 1914. Lister og Mandals Amtstidende became defunct in 1919.

References

1858 establishments in Norway
1919 disestablishments in Norway
Defunct newspapers published in Norway
Mandal, Norway
Norwegian-language newspapers
Publications established in 1858
Publications disestablished in 1919
Mass media in Vest-Agder